William Julius Mickle (29 September 1734 in Langholm, in Dumfrieshire – 28 October 1788 in Forest Hill) was a Scottish poet.

Son of the minister of Langholm, Dumfriesshire, he was for some time a brewer in Edinburgh, but failed. He moved to England where he worked as a corrector for the Clarendon Press at Oxford. In 1771–75 Mickle lodged at the manor house in Forest Hill, Oxfordshire. Mickle had various literary failures and minor successes until, while at Forest Hill, he produced his translation of the Lusiad, from the Portuguese of Luís de Camões. This was a success that brought him both fame and money.

In 1777 he went to Portugal, where he was received with distinction. In 1784 he published the ballad of Cumnor Hall, which suggested to Scott the writing of Kenilworth. He is perhaps best remembered, however, by the beautiful lyric, "There's nae luck aboot the Hoose", which, although claimed by others, is almost certainly his.

In 1781 Mickle married Mary Tomkins, the daughter of his former landlord in Forest Hill, and settled in Wheatley. He died in 1788 while on a visit to his in-laws, and is buried in Forest Hill churchyard.

References

Sources

External links

 William Julius Mickle at the Eighteenth-Century Poetry Archive (ECPA)
 
 
 
 William Julius Mickle Papers. James Marshall and Marie-Louise Osborn Collection, Beinecke Rare Book and Manuscript Library, Yale University.

Scottish poets
1735 births
1788 deaths
People from Langholm
Scottish translators
Portuguese–English translators
18th-century British translators